Boone County High School is located in Florence, Kentucky, United States. The school was opened in 1954, consolidating Burlington, Florence, New Haven and Hebron High Schools. Originally, the school did not have a mascot, but after polling the first class, the students adopts the name "Rebels", taken from the 1955 film Rebel Without A Cause.

Sports

Boone County High School is known for its athletics. Both men's and women's basketball have been among the strongest programs in the region. Baseball has also been quite strong as they won the 33rd district tournament and the 9th region tournament in 2010. The men's team once placed fourth out of five teams in a winter classic invitational tournament held in Cheyenne, Wyoming.

Boone County is known for its football tradition as well. In 2008 the Rebels went all the way to the semi-finals, in 2009 they went to the third round of the playoffs, and in 2010 that team  made it all the way to the semi-finals.

Notable alumni

 Shaun Alexander, former football player for the Seattle Seahawks
 Thaddeus Moss, football player for the Cincinnati Bengals
 Irv Goode, former football for the NFL
 Scott Kuhn, former football player for the Baltimore Ravens
 Ace (gamer), professional American Halo (franchise) player

References

External links
 Boone County High School
 Boone County Schools

Schools in Boone County, Kentucky
Public high schools in Kentucky
Educational institutions established in 1954
1954 establishments in Kentucky
Florence, Kentucky